Events in the year 1016 in Norway.

Incumbents
Monarch - Olaf II Haraldsson

Events
 25 March - Battle of Nesjar.

References

1016 in Europe